Pobjeda (MNSE: NIPO) is a Montenegrin daily newspaper. Having been published for 75 years, it is the oldest Montenegrin newspaper still in circulation; in the media, it is also the oldest Montenegrin active publication. Until September 1997 it was the only daily newspaper printed in Montenegro. On 21 May 2010, the newspaper dropped the Cyrillic script in favour of the Latin script.

History of Pobjeda

The first issue of Pobjeda was published on 24 October 1944 in Nikšić as a part of the National liberation front of Montenegro (Narodnooslobodilački front Crne Gore). Three more issues came out before Pobjeda began to be published in Cetinje, which was Pobjedas home until 1954, when it moved to Podgorica.

Pobjeda was a bi-weekly and weekly newspaper until 1 January 1975 when it switched to daily frequency. The change happened when the headquarters of Pobjeda moved from old location (Graphic institute building, at the Ribnica river bank) to the new building, in the new city quarter (Bulevar Revolucije 11).

For many decades in the SFR Yugoslavia, Pobjeda was sold on news stands in Belgrade, Zagreb, Sarajevo, Split and other large cities in Bosnia and Herzegovina, Croatia, Macedonia, Serbia and Slovenia. Many news stands in Montenegro were owned by Pobjeda.

After the breakup of Yugoslavia, copies of Pobjeda were sold in Montenegro and Serbia.
Pobjeda also published several magazines; today Arena is the first sports newspaper in Montenegro. Pobjeda'''s books and publications have received awarded at many prestigious events.Pobjedas mainly Montenegrin readership was diluted following the establishment of the two other newspapers - Vijesti and Dan.

Until 1997 Pobjeda was the only print medium published in Montenegro, but from 1997 competition from daily newspapers, together with the complex and sometimes chaotic media situation in Montenegro, made Pobjeda financially vulnerable, and caused the company to go into bankruptcy. In November 2007, the Montenegrin government announced its intention to sell 51% of its stake in Pobjeda (thus keeping the remaining 25.7% for itself "in order to be able to influence strategic decision of the new owner") and opened a tender for qualifying offers to do so. By the tender's closing on March 4, 2008 no offers had been made. In early May 2008, the government announced that it would open another tender by the end of May 2008. The government also let it be known that in order to make the entity more appealing to potential buyers, it was considering the write-off of Pobjeda's €2.2 million debt to the State through personal income taxes and contributions.
In late June 2008, Pobjeda posted a loss of €3.75 million for the calendar year 2007.

Daily Pobjeda was privatised in December 2014, and is now owed by Media Nea group.

Pobjeda is now private and profitable company. For the first time, the company was in 2015 listed on the State Tax Authority's “White list of tax payers”, reporting a profit for the first time in its history. 

Magazines
Besides the daily newspaper, "Nova Pobjeda d.o.o.", Pobjeda'' also publishes a number of periodical magazines such as "Objektiv", a weekly journal devoted to cinema and popular culture; and, since 2005, "Arena", a Podgorica-based weekly (formerly daily) sports journal.

References

External links
Official website

Newspapers published in Montenegro
Newspapers published in Yugoslavia
Mass media in Nikšić
Mass media in Podgorica